The 2003 AFL season was the 107th season of the Australian Football League (AFL), the highest level of senior Australian rules football competition in Australia, which was known as the Victorian Football League until 1989. The season featured sixteen clubs, ran from 28 March until 27 September, and comprised a 22-game home-and-away season followed by a finals series featuring the top eight clubs.

The premiership was won by the Brisbane Lions for the third time and third time consecutively, after it defeated  by 50 points in the AFL Grand Final.

AFL Draft
See 2003 AFL Draft.

Wizard Home Loans Cup

The 2003 Wizard Home Loans Cup saw  defeat  15.14 (104) to 10.13 (73) in the final.

Premiership season

Round 1

|- bgcolor="#CCCCFF"
| Home team
| Score
| Away team
| Score
| Venue
| Attendance
| Date
|- bgcolor="#FFFFFF"
| 
| 13.16 (94)
| 
| 8.18 (66)
| MCG
| 61,058
| Friday, 28 March
|- bgcolor="#FFFFFF"
| 
| 17.20 (122)
| 
| 11.8 (74)
| Subiaco Oval
| 35,083
| Saturday, 29 March
|- bgcolor="#FFFFFF"
| 
| 14.12 (96)
| 
| 10.10 (70)
| MCG
| 28,361
| Saturday, 29 March
|- bgcolor="#FFFFFF"
| 
| 14.20 (104)
| 
| 8.13 (61)
| The Gabba
| 36,197
| Saturday, 29 March
|- bgcolor="#FFFFFF"
| 
| 22.14 (146)
| 
| 10.12 (72)
| Telstra Stadium
| 30,803
| Saturday, 29 March
|- bgcolor="#FFFFFF"
| 
| 22.13 (145)
| 
| 13.11 (89)
| AAMI Stadium
| 45,436
| Sunday, 30 March
|- bgcolor="#FFFFFF"
| 
| 16.10 (106)
| 
| 15.10 (100)
| MCG
| 41,888
| Sunday, 30 March
|- bgcolor="#FFFFFF"
| 
| 19.16 (130)
| 
| 13.13 (91)
| Telstra Dome
| 27,931
| Sunday, 30 March

Round 2

|- bgcolor="#CCCCFF"
| Home team
| Score
| Away team
| Score
| Venue
| Attendance
| Date
|- bgcolor="#FFFFFF"
| 
| 13.13 (91)
| 
| 16.11 (107)
| MCG
| 51,894
| Friday, 4 April
|- bgcolor="#FFFFFF"
| 
| 17.10 (112)
| 
| 10.15 (75)
| MCG
| 43,448
| Saturday, 5 April
|- bgcolor="#FFFFFF"
| 
| 15.9 (99)
| 
| 13.13 (91)
| Telstra Dome
| 19,131
| Saturday, 5 April
|- bgcolor="#FFFFFF"
| 
| 12.14 (86)
| 
| 8.12 (60)
| Subiaco Oval
| 24,887
| Saturday, 5 April
|- bgcolor="#FFFFFF"
| 
| 10.16 (76)
| 
| 13.8 (86)
| AAMI Stadium
| 27,876
| Saturday, 5 April
|- bgcolor="#FFFFFF"
| 
| 13.13 (91)
| 
| 14.5 (89)
| York Park
| 16,217
| Sunday, 6 April
|- bgcolor="#FFFFFF"
| 
| 9.17 (71)
| 
| 13.16 (94)
| Skilled Stadium
| 22,588
| Sunday, 6 April
|- bgcolor="#FFFFFF"
| 
| 16.15 (111)
| 
| 13.11 (89)
| Telstra Dome
| 28,847
| Sunday, 6 April

Round 3

|- bgcolor="#CCCCFF"
| Home team
| Score
| Away team
| Score
| Venue
| Attendance
| Date
|- bgcolor="#FFFFFF"
| 
| 13.16 (94)
| 
| 15.15 (105)
| MCG
| 44,268
| Friday, 11 April
|- bgcolor="#FFFFFF"
| 
| 21.18 (144)
| 
| 11.8 (74)
| Subiaco Oval
| 32,009
| Saturday, 12 April
|- bgcolor="#FFFFFF"
| 
| 18.8 (116)
| 
| 10.9 (69)
| MCG
| 43,979
| Saturday, 12 April
|- bgcolor="#FFFFFF"
| 
| 16.13 (109)
| 
| 16.13 (109)
| Telstra Dome
| 24,359
| Saturday, 12 April
|- bgcolor="#FFFFFF"
| 
| 19.14 (128)
| 
| 11.5 (71)
| AAMI Stadium
| 24,902
| Saturday, 12 April
|- bgcolor="#FFFFFF"
| 
| 11.10 (76)
| 
| 15.13 (103)
| SCG
| 23,651
| Sunday, 13 April
|- bgcolor="#FFFFFF"
| 
| 20.7 (127)
| 
| 14.11 (95)
| Telstra Dome
| 20,790
| Sunday, 13 April
|- bgcolor="#FFFFFF"
| 
| 14.10 (94)
| 
| 6.10 (46)
| MCG
| 19,677
| Sunday, 13 April

Round 4

|- bgcolor="#CCCCFF"
| Home team
| Score
| Away team
| Score
| Venue
| Attendance
| Date
|- bgcolor="#FFFFFF"
| 
| 14.11 (95)
| 
| 11.15 (81)
| The Gabba
| 36,803
| Thursday, 17 April
|- bgcolor="#FFFFFF"
| 
| 13.12 (90)
| 
| 6.8 (44)
| Skilled Stadium
| 23,001
| Saturday, 19 April
|- bgcolor="#FFFFFF"
| 
| 17.8 (110)
| 
| 10.8 (68)
| MCG
| 26,359
| Saturday, 19 April
|- bgcolor="#FFFFFF"
| 
| 16.14 (110)
| 
| 20.9 (129)
| Telstra Dome
| 35,238
| Saturday, 19 April
|- bgcolor="#FFFFFF"
| 
| 15.16 (106)
| 
| 10.13 (73)
| AAMI Stadium
| 43,525
| Sunday, 20 April
|- bgcolor="#FFFFFF"
| 
| 25.17 (167)
| 
| 19.8 (122)
| Subiaco Oval
| 25,435
| Sunday, 20 April
|- bgcolor="#FFFFFF"
| 
| 12.12 (84)
| 
| 17.12 (114)
| Optus Oval
| 22,507
| Sunday, 20 April
|- bgcolor="#FFFFFF"
| 
| 11.15 (81)
| 
| 17.5 (107)
| Telstra Dome
| 44,382
| Monday, 21 April

Round 5

|- bgcolor="#CCCCFF"
| Home team
| Score
| Away team
| Score
| Venue
| Attendance
| Date
|- bgcolor="#FFFFFF"
| 
| 23.9 (147)
| 
| 12.9 (81)
| MCG
| 62,589
| Friday, 25 April
|- bgcolor="#FFFFFF"
| 
| 17.7 (109)
| 
| 13.7 (85)
| SCG
| 24,286
| Friday, 25 April
|- bgcolor="#FFFFFF"
| 
| 14.11 (95)
| 
| 18.7 (115)
| MCG
| 45,140
| Saturday, 26 April
|- bgcolor="#FFFFFF"
| 
| 9.12 (66)
| 
| 12.6 (78)
| AAMI Stadium
| 51,140
| Saturday, 26 April
|- bgcolor="#FFFFFF"
| 
| 16.17 (113)
| 
| 18.14 (122)
| Telstra Dome
| 38,094
| Saturday, 26 April
|- bgcolor="#FFFFFF"
| 
| 15.16 (106)
| 
| 12.7 (79)
| The Gabba
| 24,341
| Sunday, 27 April
|- bgcolor="#FFFFFF"
| 
| 10.13 (73)
| 
| 16.12 (108)
| Subiaco Oval
| 41,654
| Sunday, 27 April
|- bgcolor="#FFFFFF"
| 
| 18.11 (119)
| 
| 11.8 (74)
| Telstra Dome
| 27,240
| Sunday, 27 April

Round 6

|- bgcolor="#CCCCFF"
| Home team
| Score
| Away team
| Score
| Venue
| Attendance
| Date
|- bgcolor="#FFFFFF"
| 
| 9.16 (70)
| 
| 19.10 (124)
| Telstra Dome
| 38,469
| Friday, 2 May
|- bgcolor="#FFFFFF"
| 
| 9.9 (63)
| 
| 11.8 (74)
| Optus Oval
| 27,725
| Saturday, 3 May
|- bgcolor="#FFFFFF"
| 
| 14.10 (94)
| 
| 19.13 (127)
| MCG
| 17,534
| Saturday, 3 May
|- bgcolor="#FFFFFF"
| 
| 13.11 (89)
| 
| 17.7 (109)
| Telstra Dome
| 41,874
| Saturday, 3 May
|- bgcolor="#FFFFFF"
| 
| 12.12 (84)
| 
| 8.9 (57)
| AAMI Stadium
| 29,608
| Saturday, 3 May
|- bgcolor="#FFFFFF"
| 
| 12.6 (78)
| 
| 13.14 (92)
| Skilled Stadium
| 21,246
| Sunday, 4 May
|- bgcolor="#FFFFFF"
| 
| 20.11 (131)
| 
| 15.10 (100)
| Subiaco Oval
| 28,492
| Sunday, 4 May
|- bgcolor="#FFFFFF"
| 
| 12.13 (85)
| 
| 15.10 (100)
| Telstra Dome
| 27,278
| Sunday, 4 May

Round 7

|- bgcolor="#CCCCFF"
| Home team
| Score
| Away team
| Score
| Venue
| Attendance
| Date
|- bgcolor="#FFFFFF"
| 
| 13.11 (89)
| 
| 18.9 (117)
| Telstra Dome
| 32,435
| Friday, 9 May
|- bgcolor="#FFFFFF"
| 
| 17.11 (113)
| 
| 14.13 (97)
| Subiaco Oval
| 36,268
| Saturday, 10 May
|- bgcolor="#FFFFFF"
| 
| 11.18 (84)
| 
| 5.12 (42)
| MCG
| 52,196
| Saturday, 10 May
|- bgcolor="#FFFFFF"
| 
| 16.13 (109)
| 
| 18.6 (114)
| AAMI Stadium
| 44,706
| Saturday, 10 May
|- bgcolor="#FFFFFF"
| 
| 16.17 (113)
| 
| 15.11 (101)
| Telstra Dome
| 45,122
| Saturday, 10 May
|- bgcolor="#FFFFFF"
| 
| 15.8 (98)
| 
| 11.13 (79)
| SCG
| 23,276
| Sunday, 11 May
|- bgcolor="#FFFFFF"
| 
| 16.15 (111)
| 
| 12.12 (84)
| MCG
| 12,410
| Sunday, 11 May
|- bgcolor="#FFFFFF"
| 
| 10.12 (72)
| 
| 23.17 (155)
| Telstra Dome
| 12,542
| Sunday, 11 May

Round 8

|- bgcolor="#CCCCFF"
| Home team
| Score
| Away team
| Score
| Venue
| Attendance
| Date
|- bgcolor="#FFFFFF"
| 
| 8.5 (53)
| 
| 15.16 (106)
| MCG
| 48,006
| Friday, 16 May
|- bgcolor="#FFFFFF"
| 
| 15.13 (103)
| 
| 18.11 (119)
| Telstra Dome
| 39,912
| Saturday, 17 May
|- bgcolor="#FFFFFF"
| 
| 15.13 (103)
| 
| 7.7 (49)
| AAMI Stadium
| 24,702
| Saturday, 17 May
|- bgcolor="#FFFFFF"
| 
| 17.10 (112)
| 
| 16.7 (103)
| MCG
| 38,063
| Saturday, 17 May
|- bgcolor="#FFFFFF"
| 
| 16.11 (107)
| 
| 12.17 (89)
| The Gabba
| 34,469
| Saturday, 17 May
|- bgcolor="#FFFFFF"
| 
| 17.10 (112)
| 
| 11.7 (73)
| SCG
| 22,483
| Sunday, 18 May
|- bgcolor="#FFFFFF"
| 
| 18.15 (123)
| 
| 11.16 (82)
| Subiaco Oval
| 26,723
| Sunday, 18 May
|- bgcolor="#FFFFFF"
| 
| 15.17 (107)
| 
| 14.16 (100)
| Optus Oval
| 20,602
| Sunday, 18 May

Round 9

|- bgcolor="#CCCCFF"
| Home team
| Score
| Away team
| Score
| Venue
| Attendance
| Date
|- bgcolor="#FFFFFF"
| 
| 14.12 (96)
| 
| 23.8 (146)
| Telstra Dome
| 35,390
| Friday, 23 May
|- bgcolor="#FFFFFF"
| 
| 11.10 (76)
| 
| 23.15 (153)
| Optus Oval
| 24,906
| Saturday, 24 May
|- bgcolor="#FFFFFF"
| 
| 10.11 (71)
| 
| 16.5 (101)
| MCG
| 17,009
| Saturday, 24 May
|- bgcolor="#FFFFFF"
| 
| 18.16 (124)
| 
| 11.6 (72)
| Subiaco Oval
| 40,313
| Saturday, 24 May
|- bgcolor="#FFFFFF"
| 
| 22.17 (149)
| 
| 12.12 (84)
| Telstra Dome
| 46,096
| Saturday, 24 May
|- bgcolor="#FFFFFF"
| 
| 12.12 (84)
| 
| 8.11 (59)
| Manuka Oval
| 13,832
| Sunday, 25 May
|- bgcolor="#FFFFFF"
| 
| 16.13 (109)
| 
| 11.9 (75)
| Telstra Dome
| 28,001
| Sunday, 25 May
|- bgcolor="#FFFFFF"
| 
| 16.13 (109)
| 
| 14.9 (93)
| AAMI Stadium
| 44,342
| Sunday, 25 May

Round 10

|- bgcolor="#CCCCFF"
| Home team
| Score
| Away team
| Score
| Venue
| Attendance
| Date
|- bgcolor="#FFFFFF"
| 
| 14.14 (98)
| 
| 10.13 (73)
| AAMI Stadium
| 43,321
| Friday, 30 May
|- bgcolor="#FFFFFF"
| 
| 19.13 (127)
| 
| 15.9 (99)
| Subiaco Oval
| 33,250
| Saturday, 31 May
|- bgcolor="#FFFFFF"
| 
| 22.13 (145)
| 
| 24.12 (156)
| Telstra Dome
| 24,682
| Saturday, 31 May
|- bgcolor="#FFFFFF"
| 
| 10.12 (72)
| 
| 16.8 (104)
| MCG
| 34,569
| Saturday, 31 May
|- bgcolor="#FFFFFF"
| 
| 9.9 (63)
| 
| 18.15 (123)
| The Gabba
| 29,634
| Saturday, 31 May
|- bgcolor="#FFFFFF"
| 
| 8.11 (59)
| 
| 11.10 (76)
| Skilled Stadium
| 19,608
| Sunday, 1 June
|- bgcolor="#FFFFFF"
| 
| 19.14 (128)
| 
| 16.10 (106)
| Telstra Dome
| 32,715
| Sunday, 1 June
|- bgcolor="#FFFFFF"
| 
| 17.16 (118)
| 
| 14.6 (90)
| MCG
| 25,745
| Sunday, 1 June

Round 11

|- bgcolor="#CCCCFF"
| Home team
| Score
| Away team
| Score
| Venue
| Attendance
| Date
|- bgcolor="#FFFFFF"
| 
| 13.14 (92)
| 
| 13.11 (89)
| Telstra Dome
| 43,200
| Friday, 6 June
|- bgcolor="#FFFFFF"
| 
| 11.9 (75)
| 
| 10.10 (70)
| MCG
| 25,841
| Saturday, 7 June
|- bgcolor="#FFFFFF"
| 
| 13.12 (90)
| 
| 13.7 (85)
| Telstra Dome
| 30,313
| Saturday, 7 June
|- bgcolor="#FFFFFF"
| 
| 21.7 (133)
| 
| 12.7 (79)
| Telstra Stadium
| 45,917
| Saturday, 7 June
|- bgcolor="#FFFFFF"
| 
| 16.16 (112)
| 
| 9.9 (63)
| AAMI Stadium
| 30,745
| Sunday, 8 June
|- bgcolor="#FFFFFF"
| 
| 19.10 (124)
| 
| 19.10 (124)
| Subiaco Oval
| 38,540
| Sunday, 8 June
|- bgcolor="#FFFFFF"
| 
| 17.13 (115)
| 
| 12.3 (75)
| Telstra Dome
| 43,587
| Sunday, 8 June
|- bgcolor="#FFFFFF"
| 
| 10.17 (77)
| 
| 20.13 (133)
| MCG
| 60,010
| Monday, 9 June

The Kangaroos-Tigers game was especially notable as the comeback of Kangaroos player Jason McCartney from life-threatening burns suffered in the 2002 Bali bombing. McCartney retired immediately after the match.

Round 12

|- bgcolor="#CCCCFF"
| Home team
| Score
| Away team
| Score
| Venue
| Attendance
| Date
|- bgcolor="#FFFFFF"
| 
| 13.10 (88)
| 
| 14.12 (96)
| Telstra Dome
| 45,331
| Friday, 13 June
|- bgcolor="#FFFFFF"
| 
| 7.15 (57)
| 
| 15.9 (99)
| York Park
| 17,763
| Saturday, 14 June
|- bgcolor="#FFFFFF"
| 
| 12.14 (86)
| 
| 14.9 (93)
| MCG
| 36,557
| Saturday, 14 June
|- bgcolor="#FFFFFF"
| 
| 13.10 (88)
| 
| 10.12 (72)
| Subiaco Oval
| 30,127
| Saturday, 14 June
|- bgcolor="#FFFFFF"
| 
| 9.9 (63)
| 
| 19.13 (127)
| SCG
| 21,742
| Saturday, 14 June
|- bgcolor="#FFFFFF"
| 
| 13.13 (91)
| 
| 24.16 (160)
| The Gabba
| 31,185
| Sunday, 15 June
|- bgcolor="#FFFFFF"
| 
| 21.12 (138)
| 
| 10.5 (65)
| AAMI Stadium
| 40,178
| Sunday, 15 June
|- bgcolor="#FFFFFF"
| 
| 6.15 (51)
| 
| 12.12 (84)
| MCG
| 47,365
| Sunday, 15 June

Round 13

|- bgcolor="#CCCCFF"
| Home team
| Score
| Away team
| Score
| Venue
| Attendance
| Date
|- bgcolor="#FFFFFF"
| 
| 20.9 (129)
| 
| 15.3 (93)
| Telstra Dome
| 48,374
| Friday, 27 June
|- bgcolor="#FFFFFF"
| 
| 21.10 (136)
| 
| 14.10 (94)
| MCG
| 29,339
| Saturday, 28 June
|- bgcolor="#FFFFFF"
| 
| 14.15 (99)
| 
| 8.12 (60)
| AAMI Stadium
| 24,272
| Saturday, 28 June
|- bgcolor="#FFFFFF"
| 
| 12.13 (85)
| 
| 18.20 (128)
| Telstra Dome
| 42,952
| Saturday, 28 June
|- bgcolor="#FFFFFF"
| 
| 15.14 (104)
| 
| 9.7 (61)
| The Gabba
| 32,623
| Saturday, 28 June
|- bgcolor="#FFFFFF"
| 
| 15.8 (98)
| 
| 10.8 (68)
| York Park
| 17,212
| Sunday, 29 June
|- bgcolor="#FFFFFF"
| 
| 11.10 (76)
| 
| 10.7 (67)
| Subiaco Oval
| 36,641
| Sunday, 29 June
|- bgcolor="#FFFFFF"
| 
| 7.8 (50)
| 
| 13.14 (92)
| Optus Oval
| 19,242
| Sunday, 29 June

Round 14

|- bgcolor="#CCCCFF"
| Home team
| Score
| Away team
| Score
| Venue
| Attendance
| Date
|- bgcolor="#FFFFFF"
| 
| 7.9 (51)
| 
| 17.17 (119)
| Telstra Dome
| 49,148
| Friday, 4 July
|- bgcolor="#FFFFFF"
| 
| 10.15 (75)
| 
| 10.12 (72)
| Subiaco Oval
| 28,450
| Saturday, 5 July
|- bgcolor="#FFFFFF"
| 
| 23.16 (154)
| 
| 12.11 (83)
| MCG
| 31,390
| Saturday, 5 July
|- bgcolor="#FFFFFF"
| 
| 7.8 (50)
| 
| 19.12 (126)
| Telstra Dome
| 53,312
| Saturday, 5 July
|- bgcolor="#FFFFFF"
| 
| 10.12 (72)
| 
| 6.8 (44)
| AAMI Stadium
| 44,809
| Saturday, 5 July
|- bgcolor="#FFFFFF"
| 
| 13.14 (92)
| 
| 12.12 (84)
| SCG
| 31,121
| Sunday, 6 July
|- bgcolor="#FFFFFF"
| 
| 14.6 (90)
| 
| 14.13 (97)
| Optus Oval
| 24,289
| Sunday, 6 July
|- bgcolor="#FFFFFF"
| 
| 10.10 (70)
| 
| 10.9 (69)
| Skilled Stadium
| 19,770
| Sunday, 6 July

Round 15

|- bgcolor="#CCCCFF"
| Home team
| Score
| Away team
| Score
| Venue
| Attendance
| Date
|- bgcolor="#FFFFFF"
| 
| 13.12 (90)
| 
| 7.7 (49)
| AAMI Stadium
| 41,758
| Friday, 11 July
|- bgcolor="#FFFFFF"
| 
| 15.9 (99)
| 
| 7.16 (58)
| MCG
| 40,964
| Saturday, 12 July
|- bgcolor="#FFFFFF"
| 
| 15.7 (97)
| 
| 15.11 (101)
| Telstra Dome
| 38,546
| Saturday, 12 July
|- bgcolor="#FFFFFF"
| 
| 28.19 (187)
| 
| 10.11 (71)
| Subiaco Oval
| 39,129
| Saturday, 12 July
|- bgcolor="#FFFFFF"
| 
| 15.22 (112)
| 
| 9.7 (61)
| SCG
| 27,550
| Saturday, 12 July
|- bgcolor="#FFFFFF"
| 
| 14.9 (93)
| 
| 11.15 (81)
| The Gabba
| 29,684
| Sunday, 13 July
|- bgcolor="#FFFFFF"
| 
| 15.11 (101)
| 
| 14.10 (94)
| MCG
| 24,618
| Sunday, 13 July
|- bgcolor="#FFFFFF"
| 
| 14.9 (93)
| 
| 15.18 (108)
| Telstra Dome
| 14,784
| Sunday, 13 July

Round 16

|- bgcolor="#CCCCFF"
| Home team
| Score
| Away team
| Score
| Venue
| Attendance
| Date
|- bgcolor="#FFFFFF"
| 
| 9.8 (62)
| 
| 20.11 (131)
| MCG
| 54,655
| Friday, 18 July
|- bgcolor="#FFFFFF"
| 
| 12.12 (84)
| 
| 18.7 (115)
| Optus Oval
| 21,463
| Saturday, 19 July
|- bgcolor="#FFFFFF"
| 
| 17.11 (113)
| 
| 15.16 (106)
| MCG
| 32,029
| Saturday, 19 July
|- bgcolor="#FFFFFF"
| 
| 14.10 (94)
| 
| 12.14 (86)
| Telstra Dome
| 47,744
| Saturday, 19 July
|- bgcolor="#FFFFFF"
| 
| 17.12 (114)
| 
| 7.8 (50)
| AAMI Stadium
| 37,624
| Saturday, 19 July
|- bgcolor="#FFFFFF"
| 
| 11.15 (81)
| 
| 15.9 (99)
| Skilled Stadium
| 22,067
| Sunday, 20 July
|- bgcolor="#FFFFFF"
| 
| 13.13 (91)
| 
| 13.12 (90)
| Subiaco Oval
| 31,225
| Sunday, 20 July
|- bgcolor="#FFFFFF"
| 
| 21.6 (132)
| 
| 19.13 (127)
| Telstra Dome
| 25,381
| Sunday, 20 July

Round 17

|- bgcolor="#CCCCFF"
| Home team
| Score
| Away team
| Score
| Venue
| Attendance
| Date
|- bgcolor="#FFFFFF"
| 
| 14.14 (98)
| 
| 5.12 (42)
| Subiaco Oval
| 40,127
| Friday, 25 July
|- bgcolor="#FFFFFF"
| 
| 16.8 (104)
| 
| 12.14 (86)
| Manuka Oval
| 10,253
| Saturday, 26 July
|- bgcolor="#FFFFFF"
| 
| 10.11 (71)
| 
| 13.10 (88)
| MCG
| 33,368
| Saturday, 26 July
|- bgcolor="#FFFFFF"
| 
| 14.11 (95)
| 
| 24.11 (155)
| Telstra Dome
| 25,204
| Saturday, 26 July
|- bgcolor="#FFFFFF"
| 
| 15.13 (103)
| 
| 15.14 (104)
| The Gabba
| 32,043
| Saturday, 26 July
|- bgcolor="#FFFFFF"
| 
| 17.9 (111)
| 
| 14.13 (97)
| SCG
| 30,228
| Sunday, 27 July
|- bgcolor="#FFFFFF"
| 
| 22.11 (143)
| 
| 13.8 (86)
| AAMI Stadium
| 44,667
| Sunday, 27 July
|- bgcolor="#FFFFFF"
| 
| 20.15 (135)
| 
| 8.14 (62)
| MCG
| 54,500
| Sunday, 27 July

Round 18

|- bgcolor="#CCCCFF"
| Home team
| Score
| Away team
| Score
| Venue
| Attendance
| Date
|- bgcolor="#FFFFFF"
| 
| 14.17 (101)
| 
| 12.8 (80)
| Telstra Dome
| 20,714
| Friday, 1 August
|- bgcolor="#FFFFFF"
| 
| 15.14 (104)
| 
| 11.15 (81)
| Subiaco Oval
| 31,725
| Saturday, 2 August
|- bgcolor="#FFFFFF"
| 
| 7.14 (56)
| 
| 13.12 (90)
| MCG
| 40,697
| Saturday, 2 August
|- bgcolor="#FFFFFF"
| 
| 10.13 (73)
| 
| 14.13 (97)
| Telstra Dome
| 45,887
| Saturday, 2 August
|- bgcolor="#FFFFFF"
| 
| 20.17 (137)
| 
| 11.17 (83)
| The Gabba
| 28,044
| Saturday, 2 August
|- bgcolor="#FFFFFF"
| 
| 14.13 (97)
| 
| 14.9 (93)
| AAMI Stadium
| 46,945
| Sunday, 3 August
|- bgcolor="#FFFFFF"
| 
| 11.14 (80)
| 
| 12.12 (84)
| MCG
| 21,415
| Sunday, 3 August
|- bgcolor="#FFFFFF"
| 
|  19.14 (128)
| 
| 9.13 (67)
| Telstra Dome
| 21,531
| Sunday, 3 August

Round 19

|- bgcolor="#CCCCFF"
| Home team
| Score
| Away team
| Score
| Venue
| Attendance
| Date
|- bgcolor="#FFFFFF"
| 
| 6.9 (45)
| 
| 11.18 (84)
| MCG
| 22,508
| Friday, 8 August
|- bgcolor="#FFFFFF"
| 
| 10.7 (67)
| 
| 13.13 (91)
| Subiaco Oval
| 39,681
| Saturday, 9 August
|- bgcolor="#FFFFFF"
| 
| 8.14 (62)
| 
| 15.11 (101)
| MCG
| 61,868
| Saturday, 9 August
|- bgcolor="#FFFFFF"
| 
| 7.8 (50)
| 
| 20.10 (130)
| Telstra Dome
| 41,514
| Saturday, 9 August
|- bgcolor="#FFFFFF"
| 
| 14.9 (93)
| 
| 17.8 (110)
| SCG
| 33,473
| Saturday, 9 August
|- bgcolor="#FFFFFF"
| 
| 18.17 (125)
| 
| 12.9 (81)
| AAMI Stadium
| 31,083
| Sunday, 10 August
|- bgcolor="#FFFFFF"
| 
| 22.15 (147)
| 
| 12.8 (80)
| Telstra Dome
| 36,138
| Sunday, 10 August
|- bgcolor="#FFFFFF"
| 
| 15.8 (98)
| 
| 15.9 (99)
| MCG
| 18,486
| Sunday, 10 August

Mathew Lloyd would kick 11 goals to surpass Simon Madden as the Essendon Football Club's greatest ever goal scorer.

Round 20

|- bgcolor="#CCCCFF"
| Home team
| Score
| Away team
| Score
| Venue
| Attendance
| Date
|- bgcolor="#FFFFFF"
| 
| 15.18 (108)
| 
| 11.5 (71)
| Telstra Dome
| 45,367
| Friday, 15 August
|- bgcolor="#FFFFFF"
| 
| 11.9 (75)
| 
| 26.10 (166)
| Optus Oval
| 22,361
| Saturday, 16 August
|- bgcolor="#FFFFFF"
| 
| 9.9 (63)
| 
| 9.9 (63)
| Skilled Stadium
| 19,202
| Saturday, 16 August
|- bgcolor="#FFFFFF"
| 
| 14.12 (96)
| 
| 16.14 (110)
| Telstra Dome
| 29,234
| Saturday, 16 August
|- bgcolor="#FFFFFF"
| 
| 17.10 (112)
| 
| 15.8 (98)
| AAMI Stadium
| 28,032
| Saturday, 16 August
|- bgcolor="#FFFFFF"
| 
| 10.16 (76)
| 
| 14.6 (90)
| The Gabba
| 32,988
| Sunday, 17 August
|- bgcolor="#FFFFFF"
| 
| 18.25 (133)
| 
| 12.5 (77)
| Subiaco Oval
| 35,518
| Sunday, 17 August
|- bgcolor="#FFFFFF"
| 
| 13.14 (92)
| 
| 7.11 (53)
| MCG
| 40,846
| Sunday, 17 August

Round 21

|- bgcolor="#CCCCFF"
| Home team
| Score
| Away team
| Score
| Venue
| Attendance
| Date
|- bgcolor="#FFFFFF"
| 
| 20.18 (138)
| 
| 10.4 (64)
| MCG
| 30,406
| Friday, 22 August
|- bgcolor="#FFFFFF"
| 
| 10.4 (64)
| 
| 9.20 (74)
| AAMI Stadium
| 42,259
| Saturday, 23 August
|- bgcolor="#FFFFFF"
| 
| 20.13 (133)
| 
| 11.7 (73)
| Telstra Dome
| 42,256
| Saturday, 23 August
|- bgcolor="#FFFFFF"
| 
| 19.9 (123)
| 
| 13.8 (86)
| The Gabba
| 30,515
| Saturday, 23 August
|- bgcolor="#FFFFFF"
| 
| 12.9 (81)
| 
| 14.15 (99)
| Telstra Stadium
| 72,393
| Saturday, 23 August
|- bgcolor="#FFFFFF"
| 
| 13.17 (95)
| 
| 3.12 (30)
| York Park
| 15,637
| Sunday, 24 August
|- bgcolor="#FFFFFF"
| 
| 21.17 (143)
| 
| 14.7 (91)
| Subiaco Oval
| 38,029
| Sunday, 24 August
|- bgcolor="#FFFFFF"
| 
| 16.8 (104)
| 
| 18.16 (124)
| Telstra Dome
| 15,920
| Sunday, 24 August

The  vs.  game is notable as it is the highest attended Australian rules football match ever played outside of Victoria.

Round 22

|- bgcolor="#CCCCFF"
| Home team
| Score
| Away team
| Score
| Venue
| Attendance
| Date
|- bgcolor="#FFFFFF"
| 
| 12.11 (83)
| 
| 9.13 (67)
| MCG
| 68,381
| Friday, 29 August
|- bgcolor="#FFFFFF"
| 
| 12.12 (84)
| 
| 9.11 (65)
| Skilled Stadium
| 20,728
| Saturday, 30 August
|- bgcolor="#FFFFFF"
| 
| 9.6 (60)
| 
| 14.10 (94)
| MCG
| 22,969
| Saturday, 30 August
|- bgcolor="#FFFFFF"
| 
| 11.16 (82)
| 
| 14.12 (96)
| Subiaco Oval
| 43,027
| Saturday, 30 August
|- bgcolor="#FFFFFF"
| 
| 13.8 (86)
| 
| 26.14 (170)
| Telstra Dome
| 22,361
| Saturday, 30 August
|- bgcolor="#FFFFFF"
| 
| 14.10 (94)
| 
| 12.6 (78)
| AAMI Stadium
| 48,131
| Sunday, 31 August
|- bgcolor="#FFFFFF"
| 
| 9.9 (63)
| 
| 28.19 (187)
| Telstra Dome
| 26,138
| Sunday, 31 August
|- bgcolor="#FFFFFF"
| 
| 11.8 (74)
| 
| '''11.12 (78)
| MCG
| 31,389
| Sunday, 31 August

Ladder

This marks the first time that Fremantle played a finals match and the first, and only time to date that all non-Victorian teams played in a finals series.

Ladder progression

Finals series

Week one

Week two

Week three

Week four

Match attendance
Total match attendance for all games was 5,872,352 people. Attendance at the grand final was 79,451 people. The largest non-finals attendance was 72,393 people for the  vs  game in round 21.

Awards
 The Brownlow Medal was awarded to Mark Ricciuto of Adelaide, Nathan Buckley of Collingwood, and Adam Goodes of Sydney.
 The Leigh Matthews Trophy was awarded to Michael Voss of the Brisbane Lions.
 The Coleman Medal was awarded to Matthew Lloyd of Essendon.
 The Norm Smith Medal was awarded to Simon Black of the Brisbane Lions.
 The AFL Rising Star award was awarded to Sam Mitchell of Hawthorn.
 The Wooden Spoon was "awarded" to the Western Bulldogs for coming last.

Notable events
His absence in the team was severely felt as the Bulldogs ended up finishing last on the AFL ladder.

External links
 2003 Season – AFL Tables

References

AFL season
2003